Proeulia talcana is a species of moth of the family Tortricidae. It is found in Chile's Maule Region.

The wingspan is 20 mm. The proximal half of the forewings is cream brown, suffused and strigulated (finely streaked) with brown and reddish between strigulae. The hindwings are cream grey.

Etymology
The species name refers to Talca Province where the type locality is situated.

References

Moths described in 2010
Proeulia
Moths of South America
Taxa named by Józef Razowski
Endemic fauna of Chile